Arthur Hazlerigg may refer to:

 Arthur Hazlerigg, 1st Baron Hazlerigg (1878–1949), British peer
 Arthur Hazlerigg, 2nd Baron Hazlerigg (1910–2002), British peer, cricketer, soldier and chartered surveyor

See also 

 Arthur Haselrig